The 2022 Johor state election, formally the 15th Johor general election, took place on 12 March 2022. The election was to elect 56 members of the 15th Johor State Legislative Assembly. The previous assembly was dissolved on 22 January 2022.

The state election was conducted in the midst of the 2020-22 Malaysian political crisis and the COVID-19 pandemic in Malaysia. The state election is notable for being the first elections to have UNDI18 voters, where 18-year-olds were allowed to vote.

The snap election was called prematurely after the government led by Menteri Besar Hasni Mohammad had lost a simple majority in the legislature, being left with a minority government of just 28 seats, above one seat against the 27 seats of the opposition following the death of Kempas assemblyman and former Menteri Besar Osman Sapian on 21 December 2021 before the dissolution. The Sultan of Johor, Sultan Ibrahim Ismail consented to the dissolution of the Johor State Legislative Assembly on 22 January 2022.

The state election is the fourth election after the 2018 general election, resulting in the most non-simultaneous elections between federal and state elections in a single 5-year term of parliament in the nation's history. The state election is also the third election after Ismail Sabri Yaakob took over as Prime Minister in August 2021. The state election would also be the first in which 18-20 year olds are eligible to vote after the gazettement of the constitutional amendment on 15 December 2021.

Barisan Nasional (BN) continued its landslide winning streak in recent state elections, winning 40 seats and a two-thirds majority. Pakatan Harapan (PH) suffered heavy losses, winning only 12 seats. Perikatan Nasional (PN) won just 3 seats. The Malaysian United Democratic Alliance (MUDA) won 1 seat in its election debut.

Election cycles
Johor became the fourth state in Malaysia to not hold its state elections simultaneously with national elections, after Sarawak (since 1979), Sabah (since 2020), and Malacca (since 2021).

Kelantan (1978–1982) held its state election in March 1978 following a political crisis the previous year, but national elections were held only 4 months later. Since then election cycles in Kelantan have synchronized with national elections.

Electoral system 
Elections in Malaysia are conducted at the federal and state levels. Federal elections elect members of the Dewan Rakyat, the lower house of Parliament, while state elections in each of the 13 states elect members of their respective state legislative assembly. As Malaysia follows the Westminster system of government, the head of government (Prime Minister at the federal level and the Menteri Besar/Chief Ministers at the state level) is the person who commands the confidence of the majority of members in the respective legislature – this is normally the leader of the party or coalition with the majority of seats in the legislature.

The Legislative Assembly consists of 56 members, known as Members of the Legislative Assembly (MLAs), that are elected for five-year terms. Each MLA is elected from a single-member constituencies using the first-past-the-post voting system; each constituency contains approximately an equal number of voters. If one party obtains a majority of seats, then that party is entitled to form the government, with its leader becoming the Chief Minister. In the event of a hung parliament, where no single party obtains the majority of seats, the government may still form through a coalition or a confidence and supply agreement with other parties. In practice, coalitions and alliances in Malaysia, and by extension, in Johor, generally persist between elections, and member parties do not normally contest for the same seats.

Constituencies

Composition before dissolution

Timeline

Events from the Dissolution of the Johor State Legislative Assembly to the Issue of the Writ of Election (22 January to 9 February 2022)

Events from the Issue of the Writ of Election to the Nomination Day (10 to 26 February 2022)

Events from the Nomination Day to the Early Polling Day for Postal and Advance Voters & Campaigning Period (27 February to 12 March 2022)

Electoral candidates

Results

By parliamentary constituency 
Barisan Nasional won 20 of 26 parliamentary constituency by average percentages.

Seats that changed allegiance

Election pendulum

Departing incumbents 
The following members of the 14th State Legislative Assembly will not renew their term.

Controversies and issues

On 27 February 2022, Health Minister Khairy Jamaluddin said he will review a video depicting former prime minister Najib Razak purportedly violating Covid-19 standard operating procedure (SOP) during a campaign visit in Perling.
 
On 10 March 2022, Khairy revealed that his ministry had issued 42 compound notices for the violation of SOPs during the campaign period for the Johor election, including five to Najib.

See also 
 Politics of Malaysia
 List of political parties in Malaysia

Notes

References 

2022 elections in Malaysia
2022
March 2022 events in Malaysia